Irwindale is a city in the San Gabriel Valley, in Los Angeles County, California.  The population was 1,422 at the 2010 census, down from 1,446 at the 2000 census. The ZIP Codes serving the area are 91010, which is shared with Duarte, 91702, which is shared with Azusa, and 91706, which is shared with Baldwin Park.

With relatively few residents, Irwindale consists mostly of rock quarries, which are the major revenue source for the city. The Irwindale Event Center is also located in the city, as is the Santa Fe Dam Recreation Area near the San Gabriel River, a plant of the Miller Brewing Company, and a plant of the Huy Fong Foods sriracha sauce company.

The city became the new permanent site for the annual Renaissance Pleasure Faire of Southern California in 2005, after it moved from its previous home at the Glen Helen Regional Park in Devore. Irwindale, is a full-service city, it has local police and library services. There is a skate park, a teen center, a senior center, public gymnasium and a public pool. The majority of the housing is found on the southeastern portion of the city, near Arrow Highway and north of Cypress Street near Irwindale Avenue. There is also a tract of housing on the southeastern corner of Meridian St in the northwestern portion of the city, being distant from the rest of the housing.

History
Irwindale was part of the Mexican land grants by Alta California Governor Juan Alvarado of Rancho La Puente, Rancho Azusa de Dalton, Rancho Azusa de Duarte, and Rancho San Francisquito. The families of Gregorio Fraijo and Fecundo Ayon settled here in the 1850s. Significant economic growth did not arrive until the advent of the automobile, which drove up demand for the area's rocks and sand for the paving of roads. The city was incorporated on August 6, 1957.

Irwindale took advantage of urban redevelopment laws starting in 1976, and prospered in the following decade; it attracted a  Miller Brewing Company plant, the corporate headquarters of Home Savings of America, and other companies.

Huy Fong Sriracha controversy
The City of Irwindale offered a low interest loan to Huy Fong Foods in 2010 to locate its sriracha factory in Irwindale. Huy Fong took the loan and contributed $250,000 a year to the city as part of the deal. Huy Fong built a $40-million factory planned to generate about $300 million a year in sales. Shortly after Huy Fong paid off the loan early and stopped contributing to the city, Huy Fong became involved in lawsuits brought by its neighbors and the city of Irwindale, who complain of the odors of jalapeño pepper and garlic generated by the plant. The city's suit led to a court order for the plant to cease most operations.

Sand and gravel mining
Irwindale is dominated by 17 gravel pits, which it was obligated to fill. Irwindale Chamber of Commerce views the sand and gravel mining industry as a significant part of the city's strength.  In the summer of 1987, city councilman Joe Breceda approached Al Davis, owner of the National Football League's Los Angeles Raiders, about building a new stadium on the site of one of the disused pits.

Davis, long and vocally displeased with the Raiders' home at the Los Angeles Memorial Coliseum, agreed to a $115 million deal. He would take ownership of the new stadium provided the Raiders would play there for 19 years. Controversially, the deal included a $10 million nonrefundable signing bonus paid directly to Davis regardless of whether the plan would be executed. In the event, both parties were served multiple lawsuits, the U.S. Army Corps of Engineers demanded strict environmental impact assessments, and the Los Angeles County Board of Supervisors demurred, and the project was canceled. Davis pocketed the $10 million, and eventually moved the Raiders back to Oakland.

In September 2002, the State Mining and Geology Board (SMGB) asked the Office of Mine Reclamation (OMR) to review depth and mine slope conditions of the sand and gravel pits in Irwindale.

Environmental concerns 
Irwindale, along with many surrounding cities in the San Gabriel Valley, is identified as a Superfund site by the United States Environmental Protection Agency. Groundwater contamination was first found through well sampling in 1979. Contaminants include high levels of volatile organic compounds such as perchloroethylene (PCE) and trichloroethene (TCE), perchlorate, 1,4-dioxane, and N-nitrosodimethylamine (NDMA). More than 100 facilities are identified as contributors to this contamination in Irwindale, mainly through improper disposal and handling of chemicals over the years.

CleanTech Environmental Inc. Controversy 
On March 25, 2015, advocacy groups and concerned residents stood outside city hall and protested the opening of a new hazardous waste site, owned by CleanTech Environmental Inc. The protesting groups were most concerned with the facility's placement adjacent to an ecological reserve and landmark, the Santa Fe Dam Recreational Area. Protesting groups included the California League of Conservation Voters, California Latino Environmental Advocacy Network, Communities for a Better Environment, and East Yard Communities.

In an interview, CleanTech owner Bob Brown affirms that the facility will not pose an environmental concern. The building of the facility was planned to prevent storm runoff, and all waste management occurs inside the facility, not outside. He also cites the fact that recycling oil reduces California's carbon footprint and allows the waste to be turned into other products.

CleanTech's corporate offices have resided in Irwindale for over 15 years, and the new facility is expected to recycle 1.5 million gallons of used oil a year.

Geography
Irwindale is located at  (34.112, -117.964).

Climate
This region experiences warm (but not hot) and dry summers, with no average monthly temperatures above 71.6 °F.  According to the Köppen Climate Classification system, Irwindale has a warm-summer Mediterranean climate, abbreviated "Csb" on climate maps.

Demographics

2000
As of the census of 2000, there were 1,446 people, 365 households, and 293 families residing in Irwindale. The population density was 155.7 inhabitants per square mile (60.1/km2). The racial makeup of the city was 47.0% White, 0.4% Black or African American, 1.9% Native American, 1.7% Asian, 0.1% Pacific Islander, 44.5% from other races, and 4.4% from two or more races.  88.3% of the population were Hispanic or Latino of any race.

There were 365 households, out of which 46.0% had children under the age of 18 living with them, 54.2% were married couples living together, 19.2% had a female householder with no husband present, and 19.7% were non-families. 15.6% of all households were made up of individuals, and 5.8% had someone living alone who was 65 years of age or older. The average household size was 3.96 and the average family size was 4.35.

In Irwindale the population was spread out, with 33.4% under the age of 18, 10.0% from 18 to 24, 32.0% from 25 to 44, 16.5% from 45 to 64, and 8.1% who were 65 years of age or older. The median age was 28 years. For every 100 females, there were 91.5 males. For every 100 females age 18 and over, there were 93.4 males.

The median income for a household in the city was $45,000, and the median income for a family was $46,827. Males had a median income of $34,375 versus $32,016 for females. The per capita income for the city was $13,144. About 17.7% of families and 16.4% of the population were below the poverty line, including 20.8% of those under age 18 and 21.8% of those age 65 or over.

2010
The 2010 United States Census reported that Irwindale had a population of 1,422. The racial makeup of Irwindale was 833 (58.6%) White (6.1% Non-Hispanic White), 12 (0.8%) African American, 29 (2.0%) Native American, 34 (2.4%) Asian, 8 (0.6%) Pacific Islander, 448 (31.5%) from other races, and 58 (4.1%) from two or more races. Hispanic or Latino of any race were 1,288 persons (90.6%).

The Census reported that 1,372 people (96.5% of the population) lived in households, 50 (3.5%) lived in non-institutionalized group quarters, and 0 (0%) were institutionalized.

There were 374 households, out of which 194 (51.9%) had children under the age of 18 living in them, 189 (50.5%) were opposite-sex married couples living together, 88 (23.5%) had a female householder with no husband present, 32 (8.6%) had a male householder with no wife present.  There were 32 (8.6%) unmarried opposite-sex partnerships, and 1 (0.3%) same-sex married couples or partnerships. 48 households (12.8%) were made up of individuals, and 22 (5.9%) had someone living alone who was 65 years of age or older. The average household size was 3.67.  There were 309 families (82.6% of all households); the average family size was 3.93.

The population was spread out, with 373 people (26.2%) under the age of 18, 154 people (10.8%) aged 18 to 24, 397 people (27.9%) aged 25 to 44, 347 people (24.4%) aged 45 to 64, and 151 people (10.6%) who were 65 years of age or older.  The median age was 34.0 years. For every 100 females, there were 93.5 males.  For every 100 females age 18 and over, there were 90.0 males.

The homeowner vacancy rate was 0.8%; the rental vacancy rate was 2.6%.  992 people (69.8% of the population) lived in owner-occupied housing units and 380 people (26.7%) lived in rental housing units.

According to the 2010 United States Census, Irwindale had a median household income of $63,250, with 10.4% of the population living below the federal poverty line.

Government and infrastructure
Irwindale's City Council is composed of five members, elected at-large and to a four-year term. Elections were held in November of odd-numbered years until the 2015 election. Effective with the 2018 California General Election, it will be held on a Tuesday after the first Monday in November.

In the state legislature Irwindale is located in the:
22nd State Senate District, represented by Democrat Ed Hernandez.
48th State Assembly District, represented by Democrat Roger Hernandez.

The Los Angeles County Department of Health Services operates the Monrovia Health Center in Monrovia, serving Irwindale.

Public transit in Irwindale is served by Foothill Transit; FT: Maps and Schedules. There is also an Irwindale station on the Metro Gold Line.

Public safety
Irwindale has its own police department (Anthony Miranda is the police chief, as of 2014), while contracting with the Los Angeles County Fire Department for their services (Fire Station #48 is on Arrow Highway 1/2 mile west of Irwindale Avenue), but for basic paramedic services, Fire Station #29 on Los Angeles Street in neighboring Baldwin Park can be summoned, as well as Station #32 in nearby Azusa.

Irwindale was contemplating disbanding the police department and contracting with the Los Angeles County Sheriff's Department (either from the San Dimas or Temple City regional stations); ultimately the City Council opted to keep the police department intact.

Economy

Top employers
According to the city's 2014 Comprehensive Annual Financial Report, the top employers in the city are:

Molson Coors has announced it will cease production at its Irwindale brewery by September 2020, cutting all 470 jobs.

Sister city
 Salvatierra, Mexico

See also

San Gabriel Mountains
San Gabriel River
San Gabriel Valley

References

External links

 
Cities in Los Angeles County, California
Communities in the San Gabriel Valley
Incorporated cities and towns in California
Populated places established in 1957
1957 establishments in California